The Schools Sites Act of 1841 (4 & 5 Vict. c. 38) is an Act of the Parliament of the United Kingdom (the long title of which is An Act to afford further Facilities for the Conveyance and Endowment of Sites for Schools) which allowed land-owners to sell or donate a maximum of one acre of land to charities for the provision of schooling 'poor persons'. The act covered England and Wales and Scotland was also covered until the Education (Scotland) Act 1942 (although any donated land in Scotland under the act prior to this was not affected by the latter act).

The Schools Sites Act 1841 was invoked 164 years later, on 27 October 2005, in the case of Fraser & Another v. Canterbury Diocesan Board of Finance. The Board had sold land given under the act, mostly then used for residential development, and had kept the proceeds, despite a provision in the act that required funds raised from selling such land to be given back to the heirs of the original donor, should the land cease to be used for educational purposes. The case went all the way to the House of Lords, which ordered the proceeds of the sale to be paid to the descendants of the original donor of the land, as the act had required.  The case of Fraser & Another appeared on the BBC One TV programme Heir Hunters.

External links

References

United Kingdom Acts of Parliament 1841
United Kingdom Education Acts
1841 in education